Shankar Sampingiraj (born 14 December 1994), is an Indian professional footballer who plays as a defender or defensive midfielder for RoundGlass Punjab in the I-League.

Career

HAL
Born in Kolar Gold Fields, Karnataka, Sampingiraj started his professional career with HAL, then of I-League during the 2010–11 season. However, during a match against Pune the very same season, Sampingiraj suffered a ligament tear which was not properly diagnosed by his club, but was noticed and dealt with at the camp for the Indian national youth team, eventually leading to surgery on his right knee and missing substantial game time.

Pailan Arrows and DSK Shivajians
Sampingiraj signed for the Pailan Arrows then of I-League for the 2011-12 I-League season. Shankar was loaned out to DSK Shivajians of the I-League 2nd Division for the 2013 I-League 2nd Division, playing all six of DSK's group stage games, scoring once against Kohima Komets, but couldn't help his team reach the final round.

Bengaluru
In July 2013, it was announced that Sampingiraj had signed with new direct-entry I-League side Bengaluru FC. However, the All India Football Federation stopped Sampingiraj from joining the team as they said that he was still contracted with them to play for Pailan Arrows. Then, on 13 December 2013, it was announced than Sampingiraj had eventually signed with Bengaluru FC but on loan from IMG-Reliance for the rest of the season.

Sampingiraj scored his first goal for Bengaluru FC in an AFC Cup game on 24 February 2015, against Maziya of the Maldives in a 2–1 away, in added-time. Shankar scored his first goal in the I-League for Bengaluru on 3 April 2015, heading in a free-kick into the box from Eugeneson Lyngdoh in a 3–3 draw with Royal Wahingdoh. He signed a 3-year contract with Bengaluru at the end of the season; this deal will take keep him with the club until the end of the 2017-18 I-League season.

Kerala Blasters (loan)
In July 2015, Sampingiraj was drafted to play for Kerala Blasters FC in the 2015 Indian Super League. On 13 August 2013, Bengaluru, his parent club, confirmed a 3-week training stint for Shankar with Italian 3rd division side Unione Sportiva Cremonese, prior to the 2015 ISL.

Chennai City
In 2020, he moved to Chennai City on a one-year deal.

International
Sampingiraj made his Indian U23 debut against Uzbekistan U23 on 27 March 2015 in a 2016 AFC U-23 qualifier in the Bangabandhu National Stadium in Bangladesh. Shankar started and was sent-off against Syria U23 in the second match of the qualifiers in a 4-0 loss.

Career statistics

References

1994 births
Living people
People from Kolar district
Indian footballers
India youth international footballers
Hindustan Aeronautics Limited S.C. players
Indian Arrows players
DSK Shivajians FC players
Bengaluru FC players
Association football midfielders
Footballers from Karnataka
I-League players
I-League 2nd Division players
Kerala Blasters FC draft picks
Kerala Blasters FC players
Footballers at the 2014 Asian Games
Asian Games competitors for India
ATK (football club) players
FC Pune City players
Indian Super League players
Hyderabad FC players
Chennai City FC players